Juan Manuel Olivares (born July 14, 1988 in Wilde, Argentina) is an Argentine footballer currently playing for Los Andes of the Primera B Metropolitana in Argentina.

Teams
  Quilmes 2007–2009
  Everton 2010
  Deportivo Merlo 2010
  Platense 2011–2013
  Crucero del Norte 2013–2014
  Olimpo 2014–2015
  Los Andes 2015–

External links
 Profile at BDFA 

1988 births
Living people
Argentine footballers
Argentine expatriate footballers
Club Atlético Platense footballers
Quilmes Atlético Club footballers
Deportivo Merlo footballers
Crucero del Norte footballers
Everton de Viña del Mar footballers
Expatriate footballers in Chile
Association footballers not categorized by position
People from Avellaneda Partido
Sportspeople from Buenos Aires Province